El Chaqueño is a newspaper published in Tarija, Bolivia.

References

Mass media in Tarija
Newspapers published in Bolivia
Publications with year of establishment missing
Spanish-language newspapers